Menchik is a surname. Notable people with the surname include:

Olga Menchik (1907–1944), British chess player
Vera Menchik (1906–1944), British-Russian chess player